is the Tuntex Professor Emeritus of Economics at Yale University, where he specializes in the Japanese economy and international economics. Hamada also serves as economic adviser to Japan's Prime Minister Shinzo Abe and is credited as one of the key architects of Abenomics, economic policies based upon "three arrows" of monetary easing, fiscal stimulus and structural reform. From January 2001 to July 2002, Hamada served as the first president of the Economic and Social Research Institute of the Cabinet Office of the Japanese Government. At one time Hamada was also a contender to head the WTO.

He passed the National Law Bar Examination (Shihoshiken) of Japan in 1957, L.L.B. in 1958 from the University of Tokyo, his B.A. and M.A. in Economics at the University of Tokyo, 1960 and 1962 respectively, his M.A.and Ph.D. in Economics from Yale University in 1964 and 1965 respectively.

His fields of interest are Labor economics, Macroeconomics, Applied Econometrics, School choice, The Black-White wealth gap, Wage determination, Economic links among relatives, Immigration, and Changes in labor force quality. His specialized fields of interest are Game Theoretic Approach to International Policy Coordination, Microfoundation of International Capital Movements, Positive Analysis of the Emergence of International Economic Order, Effects of a Free Trade Area and Law and Economics in Japan. He writes a monthly syndicated column at Project Syndicate.

Honors
Hamada was awarded the Order of the Sacred Treasure, Gold and Silver Star, which is Japan's second-highest honor of its kind and the highest honor given to a civil servant.
Fellow of the Econometric Society and served as its council member from 1980 to 1985.
President of the Japanese Association of Economics and Econometrics (now the Japanese Economic Association) from 1994 to 1995.
The founding President of the Japan Law and Economics Association in 2003 (now its honorary fellow).
Abe Fellow, Social Science Research Council, 2009.

Selected publications

References

External links
 Personal web page
 Faculty profile at Yale University
 Social Science Research Council

1936 births
Living people
People from Tokyo
Japanese economists
Academic staff of the University of Tokyo
Yale University faculty
University of Tokyo alumni
Yale University alumni
Fellows of the Econometric Society
Recipients of the Order of the Sacred Treasure, 2nd class
Presidents of the Japanese Economic Association
Fulbright alumni